Vernix caseosa, also known as vernix or birthing custard, is the waxy white substance found coating the skin of newborn human babies. It is produced by dedicated cells and is thought to have some protective roles during fetal development and for a few hours after birth.

Etymology
In Latin, vernix means varnish and caseosa means cheesy. The term was first published in 1846 in the Dunglison Dictionary of Medical Sciences.

In-utero development
Vernix is produced during a distinct phase of the epidermal development. Around the 21st week of gestation, periderm cells are being shed and replaced with stratum corneum; these shedding mix with secretions of sebum by the sebaceous glands to form vernix, which gradually covers the body in an anteroposterior and dorsoventral pattern. Vernix, in itself, is also believed to aid in the formation of stratum corneum. By early third trimester, the process is complete.

Soon enough, part of the vernix is emulsified by increasing concentrations of pulmonary surfactants and desiccates, only to be consumed by the fetus; a corresponding increase in amniotic fluid turbidity is noticed.

Characteristics

Composition
Vernix has a highly variable makeup but is primarily composed of sebum, cells that have sloughed off the fetus's skin and shed lanugo hair. Chemically, it is water (80%), lipids (10%) and proteins (10%). The lipids include ceramides, cholesterol, fatty acids, triglycerides, waxes and sterol esters, squalene, and phospholipids; multiple detailed analyses of the polar components have been done. The protein composition is relatively understudied. Vernix of term infants has more squalene and a higher wax ester to sterol ester ratio than preterm infants.

Morphology
Vernix is composed of mobile corneocytes embedded in an amorphous lipid matrix. Precise biological mechanisms leading to its formation are poorly understood.

The cells are polygonal or ovoid in shape, malleable, and lack nuclei; typical thickness is 1-2 µm. Nuclear ghosts are frequently observed and Acid Phosphatase Activity is nonuniform. Keratin filaments build a scaffold like structure which form a water-storage area. As opposed to stratum corneum, the vernix corneocytes lack desmosomal attachment and the lipid layer is more disordered.

Physical properties
Vernix is a white viscous cream-like substance in appearance.

The water is not uniformly distributed throughout, but rather exclusively present in the sponge-like corneocytes; despite its high water content, vernix is non-polar (due to lipids) and more vapor-permeable than stratum corneum.

Functions
Vernix appears in all full term infants but with widely varying body-coverage, while premature and post-mature births generally do not display any.

It is theorized (and observed) to serve several purposes:

 Waterproofing the skin, whilst in gestation.
 Lubricating the infant's skin, and facilitating easy passage through the birth canal.
Preventing infections — primarily as a mechanical barrier and secondarily via the presence of lysozyme, lactoferrin and antimicrobial components in peptide layer.
Moisturizing the stratum corneum whilst in gestation (and controlled drying in post-partum phase).
 Thermoregulation in post-partum phase — evidence is mixed.
Quick healing of epidermal wounds.
Development of gut, after intra-uterine consumption.

Electrical isolation of the fetus is also thought to occur due to vernix caseosa (this could affect accurate fECG measurement of fetal heartbeat).

Medical uses 
Vernix is used as a reliable site-of-record for measuring cocaine exposure in pregnant women. Using vernix for diagnosing uterine rupture and amniotic fluid embolism has been proposed.

Disorders 
Granuloma and peritonitis of vernix have been observed in Caesarean sections. High volumes of vernix cause Neonatal Aspiration Syndrome.

Other species 
Vernix is thought to be unique to human fetal development; in 2018, vernix-like material was reportedly obtained from pups of Zalophus californianus.

Additional images

References

External links

Immune system
Neonatology
Skin